Tamas Viczko (born 14 November 1954 in Hungary) is a Hungarian retired footballer who last worked as head coach of the Palestine national football team.

Career
Viczko started his senior career with Ferencvárosi TC. In 1976, he signed for Újpest in the Hungarian Nemzeti Bajnokság I, where he made one-hundred and four appearances and scored two goals. After that, he played for Szombathelyi Haladás.

References

External links 
 Joke home with Palestinian footballers 
 Joke, Captain of the Palestinians 
 Gazans can't always come 
 Viczo holds trainings alongside sirens in Kuwait
 Tamás Viczkó (Törökbálint): "I don't deviate if I have to train at U10"

1954 births
Living people
Hungarian footballers
Hungarian sports coaches
Hungarian football managers
Hungarian expatriate football managers
Association football defenders
Ferencvárosi TC footballers
Újpest FC players
Szombathelyi Haladás footballers